The Ukrainian Soviet Socialist Republic, part of the Soviet Union, had four successive constitutions during its existence. The first (1919) was in Russian and the final three were in Ukrainian.

The final constitution remained effective until the Constitution of Ukraine came into force in 1996.

Constitution of 1919

The constitution was approved by the 3rd All-Ukrainian Congress of Soviets on 10 March 1919 and its final version was approved by the All-Ukrainian Central Executive Committee session on 14 March 1919. The draft of the constitution was created on resolution of the 3rd congress of the Communist Party (Bolsheviks) of Ukraine by the All-Ukrainian Central Executive Committee and the Ukrainian Sovnarkom and was approved by the Central Committee of the Communist Party (Bolsheviks) of Ukraine. It was based on the 1918 Constitution of the Russian SFSR.

It was the first fundamental law (basic law) of the Ukrainian SSR. The constitution acknowledges that Ukrainian SSR and Ukraine is one and the same, particularly starting with the words in part 2, Article 6, "To the authority of the Soviet power in Ukraine are subjected:". The constitution consisted out of four parts and 35 articles. The text of the constitution starts with the Article 1, "The Ukrainian Socialist Soviet Republic is an organization of dictatorship of working and exploited masses of proletariat and the poorest peasantry over their ages long oppressors and exploiters, capitalists and landowners". The main task of the dictatorship was ensuring "transition from bourgeois system to socialism by carrying out socialist transformations and systematic suppression of all counter-revolutionary manifestations from the side of affluent classes".

Parts and articles
 Fundamental provisions
 Structure of Soviet power
 Organization of central power
 Organization of Soviet power locally
 Declaration of rights and obligation of working and exploited people of Ukraine
 About coat of arms and flag of Ukr.S.S.R.

Constitution of 1929

Articles
 Principles
 Organizations of Soviet Power
Organs of Central Power
 About All-Ukrainian Congress of Soviets
 About All-Ukrainian Central Executive Committee
 About Presidium of All-Ukrainian Central Executive Committee
 About Council of People's Commissars of the Ukrainian Socialist Soviet Republic
Organs of Local Power
 About Congress of Soviets
 About Executive Committees
 About Soviets of Deputies
 About Competence of Local Organs of Power
 About electoral rights
 About Budget of the Ukrainian Socialist Soviet Republic
 About Coat of Arms, Flag and Capital of the Ukrainian Socialist Soviet Republic

Constitution of 1937

Parts and articles
 Social organization
 State organization
 Higher organs of state power of the Ukrainian Soviet Socialist Republic
 Organs of state administration of the Ukrainian Soviet Socialist Republic
 Higher organs of state power of the Moldavian Autonomous Soviet Socialist Republic
 Organs of state administration of the Moldavian Autonomous Soviet Socialist Republic
 Local organs of state power
 Budget of the Ukrainian Soviet Socialist Republic
 Court and the Prosecutor's Office
 Principle rights and obligations of citizens
 Electoral system
 Coat of arms, flag, capital city
 Constitutional amendments procedure

1978 Constitution of the UkrSSR

The 1978 Constitution of the UkrSSR was a fundamental law of the Ukrainian Soviet Socialist Republic, the fourth and the last of Constitutions of the UkrSSR. It was based on the 1977 Constitution of the USSR ( and adopted on 20 April 1978 by the extraordinary seventh sessions of Supreme Council of the UkrSSR of 9th convocation. Formally, it lost its validity on 28 June 1996 with adoption of the 1996 Constitution of Ukraine.

In its preamble, the constitution indicated on its succession of constitutional development of Ukraine, ideas and principles of which were fixed in constitutions of 1919, 1929, and 1937.

Articles
The 1978 Constitution (Fundamental Law) of the UkrSSR was divided into 10 sections and 19 chapters:

 Preamble
 Fundamentals of social system and politics of the Ukrainian SSR
Chapter 1 Political system
Chapter 2 Economic system
Chapter 3 Social development and culture
Chapter 4 Foreign policy and defence of socialist Fatherland
 State and Individual
Chapter 5 Citizenship of the Ukrainian SSR. Equality of citizens
Chapter 6 Fundamental rights, freedoms and duties of citizens of the Ukrainian SSR
 State-National and Administratively Territorial System of the Ukrainian SSR
Chapter 7 The Ukrainian SSR is a union republic within the USSR
Chapter 8 Administratively territorial system of the Ukrainian SSR
 Councils of People's Deputies of the Ukrainian SSR and Order of Their Election
Chapter 9 System and principles councils people's deputies
Chapter 10 Electoral system
Chapter 11 People's Deputy
 The Highest Organs of State Power and Administration of the Ukrainian SSR
Chapter 12 Supreme Council of the Ukrainian SSR
Chapter 13 Council of Ministers of the Ukrainian SSR
 Local Organs of State Power and Administration of the Ukrainian SSR
Chapter 14 Local councils of people's deputies
Chapter 15 Executive committees of local councils of people's deputies
 State Plan of Economical and Social Development of the Ukrainian SSR and State Budged of the Ukrainian SSR
Chapter 16 State plan of economical and social development of the Ukrainian SSR
Chapter 17 State Budget of the Ukrainian SSR
 Justice, Arbitration and Prosecutor's Supervision
Chapter 18 Court trials and arbitration
Chapter 19 Prosecutor's Office
 Coat of Arms. Flag, Anthem and Capital of the Ukrainian SSR
 Execution of the Constitution of the Ukrainian SSR and Order of Its Amendement

Notes

References

Source
text of the 1978 Constitution

Ukrainian
Constitutions of Ukraine
Ukrainian Soviet Socialist Republic
1919 in law
1929 in law
1937 in law
1978 in law
1919 documents
1929 documents
1937 documents
1978 documents
1919 in Ukraine
1929 in Ukraine
1937 in Ukraine
1978 in Ukraine